Karaoke Crazies is a 2016 South Korean fantasy comedy-drama film directed by Kim Sang-chan.

Cast
Lee Moon-sik as Sung-wook
Bae So-eun as Ha-sook
Kim Na-mi as Na-joo
Bang Jun-ho as Birthmark 
Myung Kye-nam as Tweezers
Jung Seung-gil as Police officer
Park Seon-woo as Killer 
Kim Si-eun as Sung-wook's wife
Park Ye-won as Min-ji

References

External links

2016 films
South Korean comedy-drama films
South Korean fantasy comedy films
2010s fantasy comedy-drama films
2010s South Korean films